Gypsy is a 1937 British drama film directed by Roy William Neill and starring Roland Young, Chili Bouchier and Hugh Williams. It based on the 1935 novel Tzigane by Lady Eleanor Smith.

Plot summary

Cast
 Roland Young as Alan Brooks 
 Chili Bouchier as Hassina 
 Hugh Williams as Brazil 
 Frederick Burtwell as Pim 
 Glen Alyn as Lilli 
 Brian Buchel as Vicot 
 Andreas Malandrinos as Hunyadi 
 Victor Fairley as Strauss

Production
The film was made at Teddington Studios by the British subsidiary of Warner Brothers. Like many Teddington productions of the era, it is now considered to be a lost film.

References

Bibliography
 Low, Rachael. Filmmaking in 1930s Britain. George Allen & Unwin, 1985.
 Wood, Linda. British Films, 1927-1939. British Film Institute, 1986.

External links
 
 
 

1937 films
British drama films
1937 drama films
Films about Romani people
Films directed by Roy William Neill
Films shot at Teddington Studios
Warner Bros. films
Films based on British novels
Lost British films
Films set in England
British black-and-white films
1937 lost films
Lost drama films
1930s English-language films
1930s British films